Stine Bodholt Nielsen (born 8 November 1989) is a Danish handball player for Viborg HK and the Danish national team.

References

External links

1989 births
Living people
Danish female handball players
People from Aabenraa Municipality
Viborg HK players
Expatriate handball players
Danish expatriate sportspeople in France
Sportspeople from the Region of Southern Denmark